Studnice is a municipality and village in Náchod District in the Hradec Králové Region of the Czech Republic. It has about 1,100 inhabitants.

Administrative parts
Villages of Bakov, Řešetova Lhota, Starkoč, Třtice, Všeliby and Zblov are administrative parts of Studnice.

References

Villages in Náchod District